David R. Murdoch (born 10 July 1962) is a New Zealand academic specialising in paediatric infectious diseases, especially pneumonia. He has also worked on Legionnaires' disease and has advised the Oxford University vaccine group and the New Zealand government on COVID-19. Since February 2022, he has been Vice-Chancellor of the University of Otago.

Early life and education 
Murdoch was born in Dunedin in 1962, and was educated at Ōpoho Primary School, before moving to Christchurch at six years old. Murdoch graduated from the University of Otago in 1985 with a Bachelor of Medicine and Bachelor of Surgery.

Murdoch also holds a Doctorate in Medicine from the University of Otago, completed in 2003, a Master of Science in Epidemiology from the University of London, a Diploma in Tropical Medicine and Hygiene from the University of Liverpool and a Diploma from the London School of Hygiene and Tropical Medicine.

Research 
Murdoch became interested in childhood infectious diseases after a trip to Nepal, working in one of Sir Edmund Hillary's mountain hospitals, where he saw the effects of measles on the local population. His work on Legionnaires' disease led to the establishment of a New Zealand-wide surveillance system.

Murdoch led a Bill and Melinda Gates Foundation-funded global study of childhood pneumonia, which changed the way the disease is diagnosed, and led to new treatments and preventative measures in developing countries. Murdoch is co-director of the One Health Aotearoa research alliance, which is a group of infectious disease experts from the University of Otago’s medical school, Massey University’s veterinary school and the Institute of Environmental Science and Research (ESR), who are working together to address health hazards across the human, animal and environmental interfaces.

Appointments 
Murdoch was one of three international experts advising Oxford University on its vaccine against COVID19.

He was Head of Pathology in Christchurch for 14 years, including the period after the Canterbury earthquakes. He was appointed Dean of the University of Otago, Christchurch in 2016. In July 2021 it was announced that Murdoch will take over the role of Vice-Chancellor of the University of Otago from acting Vice-Chancellor Helen Nicholson in early 2022.

Awards and honours 
Murdoch received the University of Otago’s Distinguished Research Medal in 2020. He also won the Outstanding Leadership Award at the university in 2020.

Murdoch is a Fellow of the Royal Australasian College of Physicians (infectious diseases), and also of the Royal College of Pathologists of Australasia. In 2005 he was made a Fellow of the Infectious Diseases Society of America, and in 2019 he was made a Fellow of the American Academy of Microbiology.

Murdoch was made an Honorary life member of the Himalayan Rescue Association of Nepal in 1988, and an Honorary member of the Holistic Health Society – Nepal, for "outstanding service and contribution in the health sector of Nepal" in 2017.

Selected publications

References

External links 

 Murdoch's Inaugural Professorial Lecture, April 2014
 Radio New Zealand stories involving Murdoch
One Health Aotearoa website

New Zealand academic administrators
University of Otago alumni
Academic staff of the University of Otago
Fellows of the Royal Australasian College of Physicians
Fellows of the Infectious Diseases Society of America
Fellows of the American Academy of Microbiology
New Zealand scientists
Living people
1962 births